Herrenvolk democracy is a system of government in which only a specific ethnic group participates in government, while other groups are disenfranchised. Ethnocracy, in which one group dominates the state, is a related concept. The German term Herrenvolk, meaning "master race", was used in 19th century discourse that justified colonialism with the supposed racial superiority of Europeans.

Characteristics 
This elitist form of government is typically employed by the majority group to maintain control and power within the system. It typically coincides with the false pretense of egalitarianism. There is a prevailing view that as people of the majority gain freedom and liberty and egalitarian principles are advanced, the minority is repressed and prevented from being involved in the government. This principle can be seen in the development of both the United States—especially the Southern states—and South Africa in the 19th and 20th centuries. In these historical scenarios, even as legislation moved toward universal male suffrage for white people, it also further entrenched restrictions on political participation by black people and upheld their disenfranchisement. The term was first used in 1967 by Pierre van Den Berghe in his book Race and Racism.

In his 1991 book The Wages of Whiteness, historian David R. Roediger reinterprets this form of government in the context of 19th-century United States, arguing that the term "herrenvolk republicanism" more accurately describes racial politics at this time. The basis of herrenvolk republicanism went beyond the marginalization of black people in favor of a republican government serving the "master race"; it contended that "blackness" was synonymous with dependency and servility and was, therefore, antithetical to republican independence and white freedom. Consequently, the dependent white worker at this time used his whiteness to differentiate himself from and elevate himself over the dependent black worker or enslaved person. According to this ideology, black people were not merely "non-citizens"; they were "anti-citizens" who inherently opposed the ideals of a republican government.

See also 
 Ethnic nationalism

References

Bibliography 
 

Ethnicity in politics
Types of democracy
Ethnic supremacy
Rule by a subset of population